Sompeta Assembly constituency was a constituency of the Andhra Pradesh Legislative Assembly, India until 2008 in Srikakulam district.

Overview
It was a part of the Srikakulam Lok Sabha constituency along with another six Vidhan Sabha segments, namely, Palasa, Tekkali, Pathapatnam, Srikakulam, Amadalavalasa and Narasannapeta.

Members of Legislative Assembly

Election results

Assembly elections 1952

See also
 List of constituencies of Andhra Pradesh Legislative Assembly

References

Former assembly constituencies of Andhra Pradesh